Yogendra Chowdhury (24 October 1934 – 11 July 1994) was an Indian cricketer. He played first-class cricket for Delhi and Railways between 1953 and 1968.

See also
 List of Delhi cricketers

References

External links
 

1934 births
1994 deaths
Indian cricketers
Delhi cricketers
Cricketers from Delhi